Adele (also spelled Adèle) is a feminine given name meaning 'nobility'. It derives from German Adel meaning 'nobility' or adal, 'noble'. In Italy its name day is 24 December in honor of Adela of Pfalzel.

Its male form is the Germanic given name Adel.

People with the given name

A–F
 Adèle of Champagne (1140–1206), French queen consort
 Adèle Charvet (born 1983), French mezzo-soprano
 Adèle of Dreux, French countess
 Adele of Meaux (950–980), French countess
 Adele of Valois, French countess
 Adele of Vermandois (910–960), French countess
 Adele Addison (born 1925), American singer
 Adele Adkins, professionally known just as Adele (born 1988), English singer-songwriter
 Adele Ajosun (died 1837), Oba of Lagos
 Adèle Almati (1861–1919), German-Swedish opera singer 
 Adèle Anderson (born 1952), British singer
 Adele Änggård (born 1933), British-Swedish costume and stage designer
 Adele Anthony (born 1970), Australian musician
 Adele Arakawa (born 1958), American news anchor
 Adele Astaire (1897–1981), American singer and dancer
 Adelle August (1934–2005), American movie actress
 Adèle Bayer (1814–1892), Belgian missionary
 Adele Boyd (1932–2018), American field hockey player
 Adele Broadbent (born 1968), New Zealand children's author
 Adele Carles (born 1968), Australian politician
 Adèle Christiaens, Belgian fencer
 Adele Cutler, English-born New Zealand and American statistician
 Adelle Davis (1904–1974), American author
 Adele DeGarde (1899–1972), American actress
 Adele DeLeeuw (1899–1988), American writer
 Adele Diamond, Canadian psychologist
 Adele Dixon (1908–1992), English actor
 Adele Dunlap (1902–2017), American teacher and nation's oldest living person at the time of her death
 Adele Duttweiler (1892–1990), Swiss philanthropist
 Adèle Exarchopoulos, French actress
 Adele Faccio (1920–2007), Italian politician
 Adele Farina (born 1964), Australian politician
 Adele Ferguson, Australian investigative journalist
 Adele Fifield (born 1966), Canadian director

G–R
 Adele Garrison, American writer
 Adèle Geras (born 1944), English writer
 Adele Girard (1913–1993), American jazz harpist
 Adele Givens, American actress
 Adele Goldberg (linguist) (born 1963), American linguist
 Adele Goldberg (computer scientist) (born 1945), American computer scientist
 Adele Goldstine (1920–1964), American computer scientist
 Adele Khoury Graham (born 1938), Lebanese educator
 Adele Griffin (born 1970), American writer
 Adèle Haenel (born 1989), French actress
 Adele Holness, English singer
 Adele C. Howells (1886–1951), American general president of the Primary
 Adèle Hugo (1830–1915), French diary writer and daughter of author Victor Hugo
 Adèle Isaac (1854–1915), French opera singer
 Adele Jergens (1917–2002), American actress
 Adele Kern (1901–1980), German soprano opera and operetta singer
 Adèle Kindt (1804–1884), Belgian painter
 Adele King (born 1951), Irish entertainer
 Adele Kurzweil (1925–1942), Austrian Holocaust victim
 Adèle Caby-Livannah (born 1957), African writer
 Adelle Lutz (born 1948), American artist
 Adele Mara (1923–2010), American actress
 Adele Marcus (1906–1995), American pianist
 Adele Megann (born 1962), Canadian writer
 Adele Morales (1925–2015), American painter and memoirist
 Adele Nicoll (born 1996), Welsh shot putter, discus thrower and bobsledder
 Adele aus der Ohe (1864–1937), German pianist and composer
 Adele Parks (born 1969), English novelist
 Adele Passy-Cornet (1838–1915), German opera singer
 Adele W. Paxson (1913–2000), American socialite
 Adele Ramos, Belizean poet, author, journalist and publisher
 Adele Reinhartz, Canadian academic
 Adele Roberts (born 1979), British radio DJ and television personality
 Adel Rootstein (1930–1992), British mannequin designer
 Adele Rose (1933–2020), British television writer
 Adele Rova, (born 1996) Fijian swimmer

S–Z
  Adele Emily Sandé, known as  Emeli Sandé (born 1987), Scottish singer-songwriter
 Adele Sandrock (1863–1937), German actress
 Adele Silva (born 1980), British soap actress
 Adele Simpson (1903–1995), American fashion designer
 Adele Spitzeder (1832–1895), German actor, folk singer and confidence trickster
 Adele Stolte (1932–2020), German soprano singer
 Adelle Stripe (born 1976), English poet
 Adele Stürzl (1892–1944), Austrian resistance fighter
 Adèle de Batz de Trenquelléon (1789–1828), French nun
 Adele Tucker (1868–1971), Bermudian schoolteacher and trade unionist 
 Adele Ann Wilby (born 1950), Australian activist
 Adele Wiseman (1928–1992), Canadian author
 Adele Wong (born 1983), Singaporean actress

Fictional characters
Adele Verans, the young French ward of Mr. Rochester in the novel Jane Eyre and its adaptations
Adele Airota, mother-in-law of the narrator Elena in the Neapolitan Novels
Elena's daughter, also named Adele Airota, but always called Dede
Adèle Blanc-Sec, main character of Les Aventures extraordinaires d'Adèle Blanc-Sec written by Jacques Tardi
Adele Mundy, Communications Officer librarian, and spy in the RCN Series space opera
Adele Azupadi, a character in the TV series The Story of Tracy Beaker
Adele Stackhouse, Sookie's grandmother in True Blood
Adèle Ratignolle, a standard of feminine beauty in the American classic The Awakening by Kate Chopin
Adele Ferguson, a character in the book Behind Her Eyes (novel) by Sarah Pinborough

See also 
 Adelheid
 Adelaide (given name)

References 

English feminine given names
French feminine given names
German feminine given names
Italian feminine given names
Irish feminine given names
Scottish feminine given names
Welsh feminine given names